Tomorrow Never Comes is a studio album by Slim Whitman, released in 1970 on United Artists Records.

Track listing 
The album was issued in the United States by United Artists Records as a 12-inch long-playing record, catalog number UAS 6763.

References 

1970 albums
Slim Whitman albums
United Artists Records albums
Albums produced by Scott Turner (songwriter)